Johan Van Steenberghe (born 9 September 1956) is a Belgian former freestyle swimmer. He competed in two events at the 1976 Summer Olympics.

References

External links
 

1956 births
Living people
Belgian male freestyle swimmers
Olympic swimmers of Belgium
Swimmers at the 1976 Summer Olympics
People from Eeklo
Sportspeople from East Flanders